Margaret Hamilton may refer to:

 Margaret Hamilton (nurse) (1840–1922), American nurse in the Civil War
 Maggie Hamilton (1867–1952), Scottish artist
 Margaret Hamilton (educator) (1871–1969), American educator
 Margaret Hamilton (actress) (1902–1985), American film character actress
 Margaret Hamilton (software engineer) (born 1936), American software engineer
 Margaret Hamilton (publisher) (1941–2022), Australian publisher of children's literature